Maria Rozman (born March 18, 1970 – Santa Cruz de Tenerife, Canary Islands) is Telemundo Washington DC's News Director of Spanish origin.

Biography 
Rozman attended the University of La Laguna in Tenerife, where she studied law. She has a bachelor's degree in Science of Communications and Arts in Business as well.

Rozman was named KDEN's news anchor and executive producer for the TV show Noticiero Telemundo Denver. She had been news anchor/executive producer in Denver and worked at Univision until 2009. She also served as the Spanish program director at the Ohio Center for Broadcasting, a radio and television broadcasting school.

She has worked for CNN Español, where she was also nominated for a National Emmy Award, and previously at Telemundo Denver as a news director and news anchor, and Univision news anchor in Denver. She interviewed U.S. President Barack Obama in 2012 and 2013 as part of the Administration's outreach to Hispanic voters, becoming the only Spaniard to interview a sitting U.S. president twice.

In the year 2018, Rozman was the forerunner of the founding parties of her hometown, Santa Cruz de Tenerife. In 2019, she was one of the presenters of the Gala of Choice of the Queen of Carnival of Santa Cruz de Tenerife.

Currently, he works as a commentator on news related to the United States on Televisión Canaria. Since 2022 she has been the director of Atlántico Televisión, the first regional private television network in the Canary Islands.

References

1971 births
Living people
People from Tenerife
American television journalists
CNN people
American women television journalists
21st-century American women